Pedro Bonifacio Palacios (13 May 185428 February 1917), better known by his sobriquet Almafuerte, was an Argentine poet.

Biography 

Palacios was born in San Justo, a western suburb of Buenos Aires, into a humble family. As a boy he lost his mother and was abandoned by his father, and because of this was raised by his relatives.

His first career was as a painter, but, because the government denied him a grant to travel to Europe, he changed direction and dedicated himself to writing and teaching. At 16 years of age, he was appointed director of a school in then-rural Chacabuco.

After meeting former President Domingo Faustino Sarmiento in 1884, he was dismissed as school director for not possessing a teaching degree, though this was arguably because his poems were highly critical of the government. He was, however, elected to the Buenos Aires Province Chamber of Deputies, and later worked as a librarian and translator for the Provincial Statistical Bureau. In 1887, he moved to La Plata and was taken in as a journalist at the newspaper El Pueblo.

In 1894 he renewed his teaching activities at a school near Trenque Lauquen, but two years later was once again withdrawn for political reasons.

At the start of the 20th century, he began participating briefly in active politics, but because of his unstable economic situation and his refusal to accept a political position, he did not do it with much enthusiasm.

At the end of his life, the Argentine National Congress granted him a pension so he could dedicate himself in full to his poetry. However, his health had deteriorated, and he died on 28 February 1917 in La Plata, capital of the Province of Buenos Aires, at the age of 63.

Literary work 

Palacios published some works under various pseudonyms, the most well known of which was Almafuerte.

Evangélicas (1915)
Lamentaciones (1906)
Poesías (1917)
Nuevas Poesías (1918)
Milongas clásicas, sonetos medicinales y Dios te salve. Discursos (1919)
La inmortal
El misionero
Trémolo
Cantar de los cantares
La sombra de la patria

See also 

Almafuerte, a 1949 Argentine film dramatized the life of Palacios

External links 

19th-century Argentine poets
Argentine male poets
Argentine journalists
Male journalists
Argentine people of Italian descent
Argentine people of Spanish descent
Argentine librarians
People from La Matanza Partido
1854 births
1917 deaths
20th-century Argentine poets
20th-century Argentine male writers
19th-century male writers
Burials at La Plata Cemetery